Ferydoon Hemmati (born 1960 in Ilam) is an Iranian politician who served as the  governor of Hormozgan from 2017 to 2021. Hemmati served as governor of Qazvin Province from 2015 to 2017 and served as a member of the Islamic Consultative Assembly from 2004 to 2008.

References

Living people
People from Ilam Province
1960 births
Iranian governors
Members of the 7th Islamic Consultative Assembly